Trujillo FC is a Honduran football club based in Ceiba, Honduras.

They play in the Liga Nacional de Ascenso de Honduras.

In 2015, they qualified for the second round of the Copa Presidente after eliminating third division side Las Mercedes, but were eliminated in the next round. They maintain a rivalry with Social Sol FC.

Stadium
Their home venue is the Estadio Jorge Leonidas García.

References

Football clubs in Honduras